The name Pere Marquette Trail may refer to either of two separate rail trails in the Lower Peninsula of Michigan:
Pere Marquette State Trail between Baldwin and Evart
Pere Marquette Rail-Trail between Clare and Midland